New Salem is an unincorporated community in Fairfield County, in the U.S. state of Ohio.

History
New Salem was platted in 1832. A post office was established at New Salem in 1832, and remained in operation until 1960.

References

Unincorporated communities in Fairfield County, Ohio
Unincorporated communities in Ohio